Athetis gluteosa is a moth of the  family Noctuidae. It is found from Norway, the Netherlands, Belgium and France, through central and southern Europe to northern Turkey, Transcaucasia, southern Russia, the southern parts of the Ural, southern Siberia, the Korean Peninsula and Japan.

The wingspan is 24–27 mm. Adults are on wing from the end of June to mid August in one generation.

References

External links

Fauna Europaea
Lepiforum.de

Acronictinae
Moths of Asia
Moths of Europe
Moths described in 1835
Taxa named by Georg Friedrich Treitschke